Pareiorhina carrancas is a species of armored catfish endemic to Brazil. It was discovered in the Debaixo da Serra, a headwater stream with clear, cold and moderate to fast flowing water of the Rio Grande basin in the State of Minas Gerais of southeastern Brazil.  This species grows to a length of  SL.

References
 

Loricariidae
Fish of South America
Fish of Brazil
Endemic fauna of Brazil
Fish described in 2003